Wooton may refer to:

Wooton desk
Elmer Otis Wooton (1865–1945), American botanist
Ernest Wooton (1941–2020), American politician

See also
Wootton (disambiguation)
Wooten
Wotton (disambiguation)